Edward Jessup is the name of:

Edward Jessup (1735–1816), Canadian soldier, judge and politician
Edward Jessup Jr. (1766–1815), Canadian politician
Edward Jessup III (1801–1831), Canadian politician
Edward Jessup, character in Altered States